Cheshmeh Qanat-e Deli Khomsir (also Romanized as Cheshmeh Qanāt-e Delī Khomsīr; also known as Cheshmeh Qanāt) is a village in Kabgian Rural District, Kabgian District, Dana County, Kohgiluyeh and Boyer-Ahmad Province, Iran. At the 2006 census, its population was 87, in 21 families.

References 

Populated places in Dana County